Csilla Hegedüs (born 9 September 1967) is a Romanian politician and member of the Democratic Alliance of Hungarians in Romania (UDMR) who served as Minister of Culture and Deputy Prime Minister in the Victor Ponta cabinet from November to December 2014. She was also State Secretary within the same ministry from March to November 2014.

In 1997, Hegedüs graduated with an economics degree from Babeș-Bolyai University; she had undertaken studies in tourism and business management at Dimitrie Cantemir Christian University. She also has a degree in adult education from the University of Pécs, which she attained in 2009. From 1997 to March 2014, she headed the Transylvania Trust Foundation, meant to preserve buildings in Transylvania. Subsequently, she became a state secretary at the Culture Ministry in March 2014, and was promoted to minister that November. She left her cabinet positions the following month when her party quit the government.

Notes

External links
 Official site

Living people
1967 births
Politicians from Cluj-Napoca
Democratic Union of Hungarians in Romania politicians
Deputy Prime Ministers of Romania
Romanian Ministers of Culture
21st-century Romanian women politicians
21st-century Romanian politicians